In Greek mythology, Meliboea  or Meliboia was a name attributed to the following individuals:

Meliboea, daughter of the Titan Oceanus possibly by his sister-wife Tethys. She was the Oceanid who became the mother of King Lycaon of Arcadia with Pelasgus. She was also loved by the river god Orontes, who stopped his waters out of love for her, flooding the land.
Meliboea, mother of Alector by Magnes, who named the town of Meliboea in Thessaly after her. The town of Meliboea became a kingdom in eastern Thessalia (north Magnesia). Nowadays, Meliboea (Melivoia) is a municipality of Larissa regional unit. The exact place of ancient Melivia is not known.
Meliboea, the only Niobid spared when Artemis and Apollo killed them. She was so horrified at the sight of her siblings' deaths that she stayed greenishly pale for the rest of her life, and for that reason she was dubbed Chloris ("the pale one").
Meliboea, a maiden of Ephesus. She loved a young man named Alexis, but her parents betrothed her to another man, and Alexis had to leave the city. On her wedding day Meliboea tried to kill herself by jumping off the roof, but landed unhurt. She then escaped to the seashore and found a boat, the ropes of which loosened on their own. In this boat, she was carried straight to the place where Alexis was dining with his friends. The reunited lovers, as they had promised before, dedicated two temples to Aphrodite, surnamed Epidaetia "The One That Brings To The Banquet" and Automate "The Spontaneous".
Meliboea, mother of Phellus, according to Hesiod. Both mother and son are otherwise unknown.
Meliboea is also an alternate name for Periboea or Eriboea, mother of Ajax the Great, who was also said to have been married to Theseus.

Kings of Meliboea
Famous kings of Meliboea were:
King Poeas (Argonaut), a friend of Hercules.
King Philoctetes, son of Poeas, was a famous archer, and a participant in the Trojan War.

Notes

References 

 Apollodorus, The Library with an English Translation by Sir James George Frazer, F.B.A., F.R.S. in 2 Volumes, Cambridge, MA, Harvard University Press; London, William Heinemann Ltd. 1921. . Online version at the Perseus Digital Library. Greek text available from the same website.
 Athenaeus of Naucratis, The Deipnosophists or Banquet of the Learned. London. Henry G. Bohn, York Street, Covent Garden. 1854. Online version at the Perseus Digital Library.
 Athenaeus of Naucratis, Deipnosophistae. Kaibel. In Aedibus B.G. Teubneri. Lipsiae. 1887. Greek text available at the Perseus Digital Library.
 Hesiod, Catalogue of Women from Homeric Hymns, Epic Cycle, Homerica translated by Evelyn-White, H G. Loeb Classical Library Volume 57. London: William Heinemann, 1914. Online version at theio.com
 Maurus Servius Honoratus, In Vergilii carmina comentarii. Servii Grammatici qui feruntur in Vergilii carmina commentarii; recensuerunt Georgius Thilo et Hermannus Hagen. Georgius Thilo. Leipzig. B. G. Teubner. 1881. Online version at the Perseus Digital Library.
 Pausanias, Description of Greece with an English Translation by W.H.S. Jones, Litt.D., and H.A. Ormerod, M.A., in 4 Volumes. Cambridge, MA, Harvard University Press; London, William Heinemann Ltd. 1918. . Online version at the Perseus Digital Library
 Pausanias, Graeciae Descriptio. 3 vols. Leipzig, Teubner. 1903.  Greek text available at the Perseus Digital Library.

Oceanids